Ceren Nurlu (born January 12, 1992) is a Turkish women's football forward currently playing in the Turkish Women's Third Football League for Tuzla Sahil Spor  with jersey number 20. She made her Champions League debut in August 2013 with her current club. She played in the Turkey women's U-17 and U-19 national teams before joining the Turkish women's national team.

Early life
Nurlu was born in Iskenderun on January 12, 1992. Her father was Mutasim Okkan Nurlu.

Playing career

Club

Nurlu began her football career at Hatay Sanayispor, a club in her hometown Hatay Province, after she obtained her license on October 6, 2005. She took part in the youth team until she transferred to Hatay Dumlupınarspor on December 26, 2008. After one season, Nurlu signed for Konak Belediyespor in Izmir on October 8, 2010.

Nurlu debuted in the 2013–14 UEFA Women's Champions League Group 1 match against FC NSA Sofia on August 8, 2013, after she enjoyed her team's  champion title at the end of the 2012–13 Women's First League season.  Nurlu played in three matches of the 2015–16 UEFA Women's Champions League qualifying round, and scored one goal.

At the end of the 2015–16 season, she enjoyed her team's champion title. She played in three matches of the Group 9 of the 2016–17 UEFA Women's Champions League qualifying round.

Nurlu transferred to Beşiktaş J.K. in the second half of the 2017–18 League season.

In October 2018, she joined Kdz. ereğlispor.

In the second half of the 2019–20 season, she transferred to Tuzla Sahil Spor, which play in the Women's Third League.

International

Nurlu made her debut in the Turkey women's national U-17 team at the friendly match against Macedonia on October 10, 2007, and scored her first international goal, her team's the only in that game. She participated in the 2008 UEFA Women's U-17 Championship qualification round Group 6 matches. Nurlu capped 5 times in the national U-17 team.

She was called up to the Turkey women's national U-19 team and played for her first game in the Kuban Spring Tournament match against Ukraine on March 14, 2009. She appeared in the 2010 UEFA Women's U-19 Championship First qualifying round Group 7 and 2011 UEFA Women's U-19 Championship First qualifying round Group 9 matches. She capped 24 times in total in the national U-19 team and scored one goal in the friendly match against the Belarusian team on April 17, 2009.

On August 23, 2011, Nurlu played for the first time in the Turkish women's national team at the friendly match against Portuguese women. Nurlu took part in the 2015 FIFA Women's World Cup qualification – UEFA Group 6 matches.

Career statistics
.

Honours
 Turkish Women's First League
 Konak Belediyespor
 Winners (5): 2012–13, 2013–14, 2014–15, 2015–16, 2016–17
 Runners-up 1): 2010–11

 Beşiktaş J.K.
 Runners-up (1): 2017–18

References

Living people
1992 births
People from İskenderun
Turkish women's footballers
Turkey women's international footballers
Women's association football forwards
Konak Belediyespor players
Beşiktaş J.K. women's football players
Karadeniz Ereğlispor players
Fatih Vatan Spor players
20th-century Turkish sportswomen
21st-century Turkish sportswomen
Sportspeople from Hatay